Tsvetana Bozhurina (later Fillippini, born June 13, 1952) is a Bulgarian former volleyball player who competed in the 1980 Summer Olympics. She was born in Pernik.

In 1980 she was part of the Bulgarian team that won the bronze medal in the Olympic volleyball tournament. She participated in all five matches played.

References 
 

1952 births
Living people
Bulgarian women's volleyball players
Sportspeople from Pernik
Olympic volleyball players of Bulgaria
Volleyball players at the 1980 Summer Olympics
Olympic bronze medalists for Bulgaria
Olympic medalists in volleyball
Bulgarian emigrants to Italy
Medalists at the 1980 Summer Olympics